Alexander Park or  Alexandrovsky Park is a park on Petrogradsky Island of Saint Petersburg, Russia. It is one of the first public parks in St. Petersburg.

Structures 

The park has a semicircular/crescent shape. The Leningrad Zoo is the largest occupant of the park. The other end of the park is the Northwestern Branch of the Russian State University of Justice. 
A  separates the park from the Kronverk (now the Artillery Museum), which otherwise would be at the center of the area. To the south of the park and the Kronverk is the Kronverksky Strait, beyond which is the Peter and Paul Fortress.

The northern half of the park are occupied by (from west to east):
 an interactive children's theater (Skazkin Dom),
 : a medium-sized venue for plays and shows,
 St. Petersburg Planetarium, 
 the Baltic House Festival Theatre, 
  ( "giant park"): a modern cinema with a food court, 
 a couple of restaurants,
 Gorkovskaya metro station.

Artworks 
It has the only outdoor miniature park in Russia:  ( "mini-town").

The Architects, a bronze sculptural group by Alexander Taratynov was installed on June 15, 2011. Commissioned by Gazprom, it depicts the great architects of the Russian Empire. For a statue of a French architect Thomas de Thomon, the image of British chemist and mineralogist Thomas Thomson was mistakenly used. Taratynov blamed Wikipedia for the error but also himself for not checking with a historian to verify the image he used was accurate.

References 

 Alexandrovsky Park, Petrogradsky district // Public association "Reconstruction of Saint Petersburg Parks and Mini-parks”

Parks and open spaces in Saint Petersburg
Kamennoostrovsky Prospekt
Cultural heritage monuments of regional significance in Saint Petersburg